is a Japanese actress. She became recognized after her breakthrough role as Kazumi Kanda in "Joō no Kyōshitsu" ("The Queen's Classroom") leading her to more prominent roles, such as Miki Ichinose in 14-year-old Mother.

Biography
 She married a non-celebrity in September 2018.

Filmography

Film 
 Kamen Rider 555: Paradise Lost (2003), Mina(Childhood)
 Tokusou Sentai Dekaranger The Movie: Full Blast Action (2004), a girl from the planet "Leslie"
 Amemasu no Kawa "First Love" (2004), Sayuri Takakura(Childhood)
 Spring Snow (2005), Satoko Ayakura
 Tsubakiyama Kachō no Nanokakan (2006)
 Kabei: Our Mother (2008), Hatsuko Nogami
 Dare mo Mamotte Kurenai (2009), Saori Funamura
 Shokudō Katatsumuri (2008), Momo-chan
 The Borrower Arrietty (2010), Arrietty
 POV: Norowareta Film (2012), Mirai Shida(Herself)
 Reunion (2013), Yūko Terui
 The Wind Rises (2013), Kayo Horikoshi (voice)
 Eiga ST Aka to Shirō no Sōsa File (2015), Shō Aoyama
 Mother's Trees (2015)
 Good Morning Show (2016), Saya Miki
 Yell for the Blue Sky (2016), Yūka Mori
 The Many Faces of Ito (2018), Shūko Nose (B)
 Laplace's Witch (2018), Tetsuko Okunishi
 My Hero Academia: Heroes Rising (2019) - Melissa Shield
 Fictitious Girl's Diary (2020)
 A Whisker Away (2020), Miyo, Tarō (voice)
 #HandballStrive (2020), Teruteru
 By the Window (2022), Yukino Arisaka

Television 
 Eien no 1/2 (TBS, 2000)
 Nukumori (NTV, 2000), Kana Murayama
 Gekai Arimori Saeko II (NTV, 2000), Rie Ogawa
 Shikei Dai no Ropeway (BS Japan, 2001), Kyōko Fujiki
 Mariko (NHK, 2001), Mariko(Childhood)
 Hatsu Taiken Episode 3, 4 (Fuji TV, 2002)
 Inubue (BS Japan, 2002), Ryōko Akizu
 Shōnentachi 3 (NHK, 2002)
 Bara no Jūjika Episode 5 (Fuji TV, 2002)
 Zako Kenji Ushio Tadashi no Jikenbo (TBS, 2002), Senju Ushio
 Stewardess Keiji 7 (Fuji TV, 2003), Kyōko
 Kamen Rider Ryuki (TV Asahi, 2003)
 Honto ni Atta Kowai Hanashi: Haru no Kyōfu Mystery (Fuji TV, 2003), Marie
 Kawa, Itsuka Umie Episode 1 (NHK, 2003), Tami Honma
 Zako Kenji Ushio Tadashi no Jikenbo 2 (TBS, 2004), Senju Ushio
 Itoshi Kimi e Episode 3 (Fuji TV, 2004), Rina Nakagawa
 Reikan Bus Guide Jikenbo Episode 6 (TV Asahi, 2004), Yuki Shinozaki
 The Queen's Classroom (Joō no Kyōshitsu) (NTV, 2005), Kazumi Kanda
 Haru to Natsu (NHK, 2005), Natsu Takakura
 Honto ni Atta Kowai Hanashi: Nanika ga Soko ni Iru (Fuji TV, 2005), Rie Sasada
 Zako Kenji Ushio Tadashi no Jikenbo 3 (TBS, 2005), Senju Ushio
 Manbiki G-Men Nikaidou Yuki Episode 13 (TBS, 2005), Aya Nakamura
 Tantei Gakuen Q (NTV, 2006), Minami Megumi(Meg)
 Suppli (Fuji TV, 2006), Natsuki Konno
 14-year-old Mother (NTV, 2006), Miki Ichinose
 The Queen's Classroom Special: Datenshi Episode 1 (NTV, 2006), Kazumi Kanda
 Watashitachi no Kyōkasho (Fuji TV, 2007), Asuka Aizawa
 Tantei Gakuen Q  (NTV, 2007), Minami Megumi(Meg)
 Dream Again  (NTV, 2007), Hina Asahina/Hina Fujimoto
 Kujira to Medaka (Fuji TV, 2008), Sachiko Imai
 Seigi no Mikata  (NTV, 2008), Yōko Nakata
 Voice: Inochi Naki Mono no Koe Episode 6 (Fuji TV, 2009), Tomoko Sōma
 Kurobe no Taiyō (Fuji TV, 2009), Mitsuko Takiyama
 Boss Episode 6 (Fuji TV, 2009), Yuki Ishihara
 Shōkōjo Seira (TBS, 2009), Seira Kuroda
 Sakuramichi (NTV, 2009), Miki Kobayashi
 Honto ni Atta Kowai Hanashi Special (Fuji TV, 2009), Yukari Mutō
 Sotsu Uta: Best Friend (Fuji TV, 2010), Ayumi Takano
 Hammer Session! (TBS, 2010), Kaede Tachibana
 Himitsu (TV Asahi, 2010), Monami Sugita/Naoko Sugita
 Bull Doctor (NTV, 2011), Mia Takeda
 Yonimo Kimyōna Monogatari: Aki no Tokubetsuhen (Fuji TV, 2011), Yuri Dōjima
 Ghost Mama Sōsasen: Boku to Mama no Fushigina 100-nichi (NTV, 2012), Aoi Uehara
 Kagi no Kakatta Heya Episode 8 (Fuji TV, 2012)
 Black Board: Jidai to Tatakatta Kyōshi Tachi (TBS, 2012)
 Reset: Hontō no Shiawase no Mitsukekata (TBS, 2012), Tomoko Miyoshi
 Tazunebito (WOWOW, 2012), Mitsuki Ōmae
 A Chef of Nobunaga (TV Asahi, 2013), Natsu
 ST: Keishichō Kagaku Tokusōhan  (NTV, 2013), Shō Aoyama
 Naru Youni Narusa (TBS, 2013), Yōko Uchida
 Dandarin: Rōdō Kijun Kantokukan Episode 4 (NTV, 2013), Yumi Sanada
 Naru Youni Narusa Season 2 (TBS, 2014), Yōko Uchida
 A Chef of Nobunaga Part 2 (TV Asahi, 2014), Natsu
 ST Aka to Shirō no Sōsa File (NTV, 2014), Shō Aoyama
 Masshiro (TBS, 2015), Nana Matsuoka
 Daddy Sister (NHK, 2016)
 The Supporting Actors (TV Tokyo, 2017), herself
 The Many Faces of Ito (TBS, 2017), Shūko Nose (B)
 Temp Staff Psychic Ataru (TV Asahi, 2019)
 Asagao: Forensic Doctor (Fuji TV, 2019)
 Yell (NHK, 2020)
 The Supporting Actors 3 (TV Tokyo, 2021), herself
 What Will You Do, Ieyasu? (NHK, 2023), Ito

Dubbing
Tomorrowland (June 2015), Casey Newton (Britt Robertson)

Commercials 
 Tokyo Denryōku
IH Cooking Heater
TEPCO Hikari
"Mama no Manzoku (Shopping)" (May 2006 – November 2006)
"Ojīchan no Manzoku" (May 2006 – November 2006)
 Marvelous Interactive "Bokujō Monogatari Series"
Nintendo DS "Bokujō Kimi to Sodatsu Shima" (September 2006)
"Sekai ga Sodatsu" (December 2006 – present)
 KDDI "au"
Oyako de, au debut no Haru.
"Kenka" (February 2007)
"Chichi wa Tatsujin" (February 2007)
 House Foods Corporation "Fruity" (February 2007)
 Kankō Gakuseifuku (October 2008)
 Kyushu Telecommunication Network "BBIQ" (October 2008 – October 2012)
 Bridgestone Cycle "Albelt" (January 2009)
 Bourbon "Alfort Mini Chocolate" (September 2014)
 Level-5 Nintendo 3DS "Fantasy Life" (December 2012)
 Daihatsu "Move" (May 2013)
 Ajinomoto "Pal Sweet Bioligo" (April 2015)

Bibliography

Books
 Mirai Nikki (Ameba Books, October 2009),

Photobooks
 14-sai, 15-sai, 16-sai no Mirai (Kadokawa Marketing, 6 November 2009), 
 Mirai: Chiisai Desukedo, Nanika? (Tokyo News Service, March 2012), 
 Arigatou (Kadokawa, 11 January 2014),

Awards and nominations

References

External links 
 Official Mirai Shida homepage (also source) 
 
 Shida Mirai TV appearance information 
 Official Mirai Shida friendster

1993 births
Japanese child actresses
Japanese television actresses
Living people
People from Ayase, Kanagawa
Actresses from Kanagawa Prefecture
Ken-On artists